Truth & Soul was a record label and production team based in Williamsburg, Brooklyn. It was formed in 2004 by Jeff Silverman and Leon Michels with help of Philippe Lehman. The label was best known for their releases with Lee Fields & The Expressions and other New York retro-soul / funk groups. As a production house and recording studio, Truth & Soul worked with artists like Aloe Blacc ("I Need a Dollar") and Adele ("Right as Rain"). In 2016, Truth & Soul's catalog was acquired by The Orchard, and was succeeded by Big Crown Records and Mighty Eye Records.

History

Soul Fire Records 
Truth & Soul was born out of Soul Fire Records, a label run by musician Phillip Lehman. Lehman had previously run soul revival pioneer Desco Records with Bosco Mann, and founded Soul Fire in 1999 as a funk label; Mann would later open the soulful Daptone Records. Between 1999 and 2003, Soul Fire put out numerous records by artists like Lee Fields and The Whitefield Brothers. In 2003, Lehman retired from the music business, eventually moving to the Dominican Republic.

Formation and releases of Truth & Soul 
Truth & Soul Records was founded in 2004. When Lehman decided to move to the Dominican Republic, he left Soul Fire Studios to Silverman, who was Soul Fire Records label manager at the time.  Silverman then asked Michels to join him in forming a new label (Silverman, a huge fan of the movie Putney Swope, by Robert Downey Sr., suggested Truth & Soul be the new labels name).  Hence Truth & Soul Records was formed.  Silverman and Michels ran the day to day of the label, eventually bringing Danny Akalepse in as label manager, and both Silverman and Michels were the in-house production team. The label has recorded and released the music of El Michels Affair, Bronx River Parkway, Quincy Bright, The Evil D's, Lee Fields and The Expressions, The Fabulous Three, Cosmic Force, The Olympians, Tyrone Ashley's Funky Music Machine, Ghetto Brothers, The Phenomenal Handclap Band, and Bama & The Family.

In 2008, Truth & Soul produced and released the Lee Fields & The Expressions album My World to critical acclaim. The same year they produced Aloe Blacc's sophomore record, Good Things, which was released on Stones Throw records on September 28, 2010. Eventually their studio space was acquired by Vice Magazine at the end of 2012 and both Silverman and Michels went on to build new recording studios. The Diamond Mine, was built in Long Island City in 2014 by Michels and his frequent collaborators Thomas Brenneck, Nick Movshon, and Homer Steinweiss.  Silverman went on to build his own studio in Red Hook, Brooklyn (in 2016) named Future Sounds.

Truth & Soul has remixed "Love Is a Losing Game" by Amy Winehouse, the Gabriella Cilmi single "Sweet About Me", Dinah Washington's "Cry Me A River" for Verve Remixed 4, and Truth & Soul are credited as writers on Adele's grammy nominated album, 19. Their records have been sampled by Ghostface Killah, Just Blaze, Jay-Z, Young Jeezy. Other venture included curating the in-game radio station of the same name in the 2009 video game GTA: Chinatown Wars.

Legacy and Big Crown Records / Mighty Eye Records 

Silverman and Michels dissolved Truth & Soul in July 2016 with The Orchard acquiring the label and the distribution rights to its catalog. Soon after, Michels co-founded Big Crown Records with Truth & Soul manager Danny Akalepse. Some artists on the Truth & Soul roster moved to Big Crown at this time.   Jeff 'Dynamite' Silverman went on to work for Rockstar Games on the original soundtrack to Red Dead Redemption 2. He then started a new label Mighty Eye Records in 2022, continuing the heavy funk sounds of Soul Fire and Truth & Soul.

Artists 
Noted 'featured artists' included:
 Bronx River Parkway †
 Cosmic Force
 El Michels Affair †‡
 Fabulous Three (Leon Michel & Jeff Silverman) †
 Jr Thomas & The Volcanos
 Lady Wray ‡
 Lee Fields & The Expressions †‡
 Liam Bailey ‡
 Michael Leonhart and Avramina 7
 Shirley Nanette
 Tyrone Ashley & Funky Music Machine (reissue)
 Ghetto Brothers (reissue)

† denotes artist on Soul Fire Records
‡ denotes artists on Big Crown Records

Discography

See also 
List of record labels

References

External links
 Official site
 Interview with Leon Michels 
 Village Voice Article on Tyrone Ashley

American record labels
Reissue record labels
House music record labels
World music record labels
Folk record labels
Electronic music record labels
Psychedelic trance record labels
Pop record labels
Soundtrack record labels
Hip hop record labels
Electronic dance music record labels
Experimental music record labels